Waze, formerly FreeMap Israel, is a subsidiary company of Google that provides satellite navigation software on smartphones and other computers that support the Global Positioning System (GPS). In addition to turn-by-turn navigation, it incorporates user-submitted travel times and route details while downloading location-dependent information over a cellular network. Waze describes its application as a community-driven initiative that is free to download and use.

The software was originally developed in Israel by Waze Mobile, a company founded by Israeli entrepreneurs Ehud Shabtai, Amir Shinar, and Uri Levine. Funding for the initial project was provided by two Israeli venture capital firms, Magma and Vertex Ventures Israel, as well as by an early-stage American venture capital firm, Bluerun Ventures. In June 2013, Waze Mobile was acquired by Google for US$1.3 billion.

The application generates revenue through hyperlocal advertising to an estimated 130 million users.

History

Development
In 2006, Israeli programmer Ehud Shabtai founded a community project known as FreeMap Israel, which aimed to create (with the crowd-sourcing assistance of community users) a free digital mapping database of Israel compiled in the Hebrew language with ensured free content, updates, and distribution. In 2008, Shabtai formed a company called Waze to commercialize the initial project; in 2009, it was renamed to Waze Mobile Ltd.

In 2010, the company raised US$25 million in the second round of funding; an additional $30 million was raised in financing in the following year. The application was updated in 2011 to display real-time, community-curated points of interest, including local events such as street fairs and protests.

By December 2011, Waze had employed 80 people, 70 of whom were based in Raʽanana, Israel, with the remaining 10 based in Palo Alto, United States. In November 2012, the company began to monetize its application, offering resellers and advertisers a web interface to advertise based on location, where a small icon appears when a phone is at a particular location, prompting the user to engage. It also offers television news stations a web interface to broadcast current traffic reports and alerts directly from the Waze application; the service had been in use by 25 American television news stations by June 2013. It has also been used in Rio de Janeiro, Brazil, inside  (Rio's Operations Center) since July 24, 2013, as well as in the American states of New York and New Jersey since 2012.

In 2013, the GSM Association, a trade association of mobile network operators, gave Waze the Best Overall Mobile App award at the association's Mobile World Congress exhibition.

Acquisition by Google 
In June 2013, Waze was acquired by Google for $1.3 billion. Waze's then-100 employees received about $1.2 million on average: the largest payout to employees in Israeli high tech.

In June 2013, the Federal Trade Commission (FTC) of the United States began a consideration of whether Google's acquisition of Waze was potentially violating competition law; Waze was among a very small group of competitors in the mobile mapping sector against Google Maps. The FTC later decided that it would not challenge the deal; the Office of Fair Trading of the United Kingdom and the Israel Antitrust Authority also launched an investigation, in which the acquisition was ultimately unchallenged. However, in 2020, the FTC announced that it would be re-examining Google's 2013 acquisition of Waze.

Overview 
Waze collects map data, travel times, and traffic information from users and transmits it to the Waze server, at no cost to Waze. Waze users ("Wazers") can report accidents, traffic jams, speed and police traps, and, from the online map editor, can update roads, landmarks, house numbers, etc. Waze sends anonymous information, including users' speed and location, back to its database to improve the service as a whole.

Based on the information collected, Waze is then in a position to provide routing and real-time traffic updates. Waze can also identify the cheapest fuel station near a user or along their route, provided Waze has enabled fuel prices for that country. The fuel prices are reported and updated by users and/or other third parties in proximity to a station. This feature currently only supports gasoline and diesel pricing.

Waze offers turn-by-turn voice navigation, real-time traffic, and other location-specific alerts. Waze encourages users to report traffic or road hazards through incentives such as acquiring points for their profiles.

Features 
Waze has the ability to direct users based on crowdsourced information. Waze users are able to report a multitude of traffic-related incidents from accidents to police traps. This data is used by Waze to help other users either by alerting them of the condition ahead or rerouting the user to avoid the area entirely. In addition to user input, Waze relies on information from state agencies for traffic events such as road construction. The idea behind this is that the more people that provide data the more accurate it will be.

In addition to using crowdsourced information for traffic alerts, Waze also allows registered users to modify the map data itself through the Waze Map Editor. Map editors are allowed to make changes to the map based on where they have driven while using Waze as well as their rank which is based on how many map edits a user has made.
In June 2013, Waze introduced a global localization project that enables future road closures and real-time traffic updates during major events in a given country, for example the Tour de France. Google also acquired Waze in the same month. At the time of Google's acquisition, there were nearly 50 million Waze users. In 2017, an option was added for motorcycle users, as well as specialized routes for people eligible to drive in carpool lanes.

Waze also lets users choose their navigation voice. Some featured voices include Morgan Freeman, T-Pain, DJ Khaled, Arnold Schwarzenegger, Cookie Monster, Colonel Sanders, Kevin Hart, Shaq, and many more.

In March 2017, Spotify announced its partnership with Waze to give an integrated experience where Wazers could play music on Spotify directly from Waze app and get Waze directions on Spotify app on the Android platform. Six months later, the feature was made available on the iOS platform. In May 2017, Waze introduced the ability for users to record their own voice navigation prompts.

In August 2018, Waze introduced Android Auto support. In September 2018, Waze introduced Apple CarPlay support after Apple released iOS 12.

In October 2018, Waze announced its partnership with Pandora, Deezer, iHeart Radio, NPR One, Scribd, Stitcher, and TuneIn for Waze Audio Player which Spotify has been Waze inaugural partner. However, Android users won't be able to link Deezer, and iOS users won't have access to Pandora, NPR, or TuneIn when Waze announced its partnership in Medium suggesting joining its beta program to be able to use mentioned services.

In February 2019, Waze updated its iOS platform with Siri Shortcuts support. In May 2019 the company announced it would be adding Pandora a new streaming service to the audio play feature for iOS users, allowing riders to have more music options during their commute. In August 2019, Waze added YouTube Music integration to both platforms.

Google announced at the Google I/O 2019 developer conference it was adding Google Assistant integration with Waze. The integration was made available to Android phones in June 2019.

In September 2020, Waze added support for lane guidance. Waze also announced that starting in October 2020, it would implement trip suggestions, pulling together suggestions from recently visited places.

Waze ran a dedicated carpooling app, Waze Carpool, which was first launched in 2016 and was available in the USA, Brazil, and Israel. Google has announced that the app will be retired in 2022, citing COVID-related changes in commuting patterns that led to a sharp decline in carpooling.

Connected Citizens Program / Waze for Cities 
Waze launched the Connected Citizens Program (CCP) in June 2014, a free, two-way data sharing program used by over 450 governments, departments of transportation, and municipalities for traffic analysis, road planning, and emergency workforce dispatching. The program is a two-way data exchange between Waze and the partner.

In 2014, Rio de Janeiro started collecting data for its traffic management system. Rio collects real-time data both from drivers who use the Waze navigation app and pedestrians who use the public-transportation app Moovit. Rio was also talking to the owners of cycling app Strava to monitor movements of cyclists. It was noted that though initially the data the apps were sharing was all anonymous, more specific identifying details were possible, if people agreed to being monitored through their smartphones if they saw benefits for them.

In 2021, the program got a major overhaul and got renamed Waze for Cities (W4C.)

Criticism 
Concerns have been expressed that the app located on smartphones can be used to monitor movements by identifiable individuals.

Some road-safety advocates have voiced concern over the prospect of more drivers using Waze, which they say has the potential to distract them with a flurry of icons and notifications and put them at greater risk of an accident.

In March 2014, a successful attempt was made by students from Technion – Israel Institute of Technology to fake a traffic jam.

In December 2014, in a letter sent to Google, Los Angeles Police Department Chief Charlie Beck complained about the police locator feature, claiming it could be "misused by those with criminal intent to endanger police officers and the community". It was alleged that Ismaaiyl Brinsley, who shot and killed two NYPD officers that month, had used the Waze app prior to the murders and had posted a screenshot from the app on his Instagram account hours before the shootings, but that was unsubstantiated as the post was made three weeks prior to the shootings. Users are able to mark the presence of an officer with a small icon and indicate if the officer is visible or hidden. The LAPD, among other police agencies, pressured Google to disable the feature on the application. Google states that knowing the whereabouts of an officer promotes safer driving.

In April 2018, Waze was criticized for rerouting traffic to Baxter Street in Echo Park, Los Angeles, which is one of the steepest hills in the United States. The app was blamed for exacerbating the road's present condition and increasing the number of crashes and spin-outs at the steep hill. The LA municipality later reconfigured the road to a one-way street.

On March 05 2023, A car ended up stuck on the tracks of the Philippine National Railways (PNR) Beata station along Tomas Claudio street in Pandacan, Manila. According to reports, the driver, a foreigner, and his companion used Waze on their way home to Makati from Adriatico street in Manila.

Licensing
Waze Mobile Ltd holds several patents. The Waze v2.x software was distributed under GNU General Public License v2, which did not extend to map data. The base map data initially came from US Census Bureau TIGER data. FreeMap data was not published under open content licenses even before the shift to Waze project. Ehud Shabtai who initiated and developed Freemap and Waze continuously insisted to crowdsource data without using external sources or projects like OpenStreetMap that would restrict commercialization of the Waze map data.
Starting with Waze v3 the application was rewritten and as such switched to a proprietary license. The last open-source client version for the iPhone and Android is 2.4.0.0, and for Windows Mobile 2.0.

A class action suit was filed in March 2014 by accountant Roey Gorodish against Waze, claiming intellectual property violation for the use of open-source FreeMap map and code from the open-source RoadMap software, a project that Ehud Shabtai had contributed for the Windows PocketPC version in 2006. The lawsuit was dismissed on March 5, 2017 with a clear-cut decision that there was no basis for a class action suit in this case. The lawsuit was dismissed again with final verdict given by the Israeli Supreme Court on 28 January 2019.

See also 
 Comparison of satellite navigation software

References

External links 

 

2006 establishments in Israel
Software companies established in 2006
Companies based in Palo Alto, California
Crowdsourcing
Alphabet Inc.
Google acquisitions
Google software
IOS software
Mobile route-planning software
Navigation system companies
Software companies of Israel
Mergers and acquisitions of Israeli companies
Android Auto software
2013 mergers and acquisitions
Israeli inventions